The Paul Sauer Bridge, also known as the Storms River Bridge, is a deck arch bridge over the Storms River in the Eastern Cape of South Africa. The bridge is located on the Garden Route section of National Route 2, between Cape Town and Port Elizabeth.

It is named after Paul Sauer.

Structural design
The bridge was designed by Italian engineer Riccardo Morandi, and constructed by Concor between 1953 and 1956.

The main span of the bridge consists of a reinforced concrete arch structure spanning between two concrete abutments located on the western and eastern sides of the river. The deck of the bridge consists of three main spans, the center span between the two abutments and the two approach spans up to the joint above the abutments. The reinforced concrete deck is supported by the arch by means of 12 sets three reinforced concrete columns or struts.

Construction of the bridge

The main arch structure was constructed in a unique fashion: the complete arch was divided into four semi-arches which were built with climbing formwork in an essentially vertical position on opposite sides of the gorge. These were then rotated and lowered into position in pairs to meet at the centre, thus forming the completed arch structure.

Maintenance
The Paul Sauer Bridge was renovated in 1986.

References

External links

 

Bridges in South Africa
Arch bridges
Bridges completed in 1971
Concrete bridges
Deck arch bridges